Kempegowda 2 is a 2019 Kannada action film directed by Shankar Gowda. The film stars Komal Kumar, Rakshika Sharma in lead roles alongside Sreeshanth and Yogesh in supporting roles. The film was produced by A. Vinodh under Panchamukhi Hanuman Cine Productions. The film's soundtrack was composed by Varun Unni. Despite the title, the film is not a sequel to the 2011 film of same name.

Cast 
Komal Kumar as Kempe Gowda
Rakshika Sharma
Sreeshanth as Deshmukh
Yogesh
Nagendra Babu
Ali
Madhusudhan Rao
Viji Chandrasekhar
Satya Prakash

Production 
The film featured Komal Kumar in a serious role of a cop , for the first time completely different from comedic roles which he was known for. He agreed to do this role as 'he was getting tired of being typecast as a comedian' and had to lose weight around 23 kilos to look the part. The film marked the acting debut of Sreesanth in Kannada film industry aka Sandalwood.

Music 
The original songs and background score of the film were composed by Varun Unni.
"Usire" - Varun Unni, Supriya Lohith
"Kempe Gowda" - Patla Sathish Shetty, Zia Ul Haq

Reception 
Times of India wrote "While the story is inspiring, the edit could have helped land the final punch more adequately. If you are a fan of cop-oriented action dramas, Kempegowda 2 might just be your cup of tea". Bangalore Mirror wrote "What is not good is the slow-paced narrative. It would not feel slow if the thrills and twists were more pronounced. The film tries to take itself seriously This was unnecessary as in any such film, it is entertainment that should take precedence. Despite this flaw, Kempegowda 2 is a good watch".

References 

2019 films
Indian action films
2010s Kannada-language films
2019 action films